United States Army, Japan (USARJ) is a Major Command of the United States Army. It consists of  operating port facilities and a series of logistics installations throughout Honshū and Okinawa. USARJ participates actively with the Japan Ground Self-Defense Force in bilateral training exercises and the development of bilateral plans. It commands and supports United States Army assigned units, attached units, and augmentation forces and employs these forces in support of the commander. USARJ maintains and strengthens the credibility of deterrent power in the Pacific through maintenance of defense facilities, war reserves and operational project stocks. USARJ is headquartered at Camp Zama.

As the Army Component Command to United States Forces Japan (USFJ) and as a Major Subordinate Command of United States Army Pacific (USARPAC) , United States Army Japan (USARJ)/I Corps (Forward) is responsible to provide support of Article V (Defense of Japan) and VI (ensuring regional stability) of the Mutual Security Treaty (MST).  It serves as a forward stationed Army command and control headquarters; supports regional security cooperation activities with the Japan Ground Self Defense Force (JGSDF) for the purpose of contributing to the security of Japan and maintenance of peace and security in the Far East; provides communities of excellence and installation operations that support Soldiers, Civilians, and their Families.

Organization 
The following units make up US Army Japan:

 United States Army Japan, Honshu, Japan
I Corps (Forward)
U.S. Army Garrison Japan (Camp Zama)
United States Army Aviation Battalion, Japan
35th Combat Sustainment Support Battalion
78th Signal Battalion
 311th Military Intelligence Battalion
 United States Army Japan Band
 10th Support Group (Brigade-level logistics)
 38th Air Defense Artillery Brigade
JAPAN ENGINEER DISTRICT U.S. Army Corps of Engineers   
 1st Battalion/1st Special Forces Group
 836th Transportation Battalion
 835th Transportation Battalion
 Brigadier General Crawford F. Sams United States Army Health Clinic Japan
DENTAC-J
 Public Health Activity - Japan

History

United States Army Japan (USARJ) can be traced back to the U.S. Army Forces Far East (AFFE), which was formed in Manila in July 1941. Commanded by General of the Army Douglas MacArthur, the headquarters (HQ) moved to Melbourne, Australia in 1942. After the war, the headquarters first moved to Tokyo, then to Yokohama in 1953, and finally to its present location on Camp Zama in October 1953.

Reorganization of U.S. forces in the Pacific in January 1953 established AFFE as the major Army command in the Far East. AFFE moved to Camp Zama, 35 miles southwest of Tokyo, in October 1953 into a new headquarters building designed by Antonin Raymond. On 20 November 1954, AFFE was combined with the Eighth US Army to become AFFE/Eighth US Army. In 1955, the Eighth US Army moved its headquarters to Yongsan Garrison, Seoul, Korea, and the Camp Zama command element was designated AFFE/Eighth US Army (Rear). The name, U.S. Army Japan (USARJ), first appeared on 1 July 1957 in a reorganization of US forces in the Pacific.

On 1 July 1957, a U.S. Forces reorganization in the Pacific designated USARJ as one of the major subordinate commands of U.S. Army Pacific (USARPAC) in Hawaii. Reorganized again on 1 September 1968, USARJ employed a new structure to maximize operational efficiency while keeping its existing missions and functions.

The reversion of Okinawa to Japanese control on 15 May 1972, resulted in the realignment of the Army's Pacific commands with HQ USARJ absorbing elements for Okinawa, adjusting the command chain.  IX Corps was transferred from Okinawa and collocated with this command to become HQ USARJ/IX Corps.

On 1 July 1974, a USARJ reorganization established three subordinate commands: U.S. Army Garrison, Honshu (USAGH); U.S. Army Garrison, Okinawa (USAGO); and the U.S. Army Medical Department Activity-Japan, (MEDDAC-JAPAN). With the discontinuance of USARPAC, USARJ was designated a major Army command on 1 January 1975, reporting directly to Department of the Army.

In August 1990, USARPAC was reestablished and USARJ became a major subordinate command of that headquarters as well as continuing as the Army Component Command of U.S. Forces, Japan (USFJ). In 1994, IX Corps was replaced by 9th Theater Army Area Command and on 8 November 1999, was redesignated 9th Theater Support Command (TSC). There were several minor reorganizations and redesignations over the next decade so that by 11 September 2001, USARJ consisted of logistics bases in Japan and Okinawa.

In September 2007, the 9th TSC was inactivated and on 19 December 2007, I Corps (Forward) was activated in Japan in line with the Army's transformation efforts. USARJ remains headquartered at Camp Zama, where it engages in numerous bilateral activities with the Japan Ground Self-Defense Force (JGSDF) and performs duties as United States Forces Japan's Army Component Command.

Command of the 78th Signal Battalion remained with the Hawaii-based 516th Signal Brigade (formerly 1106th) and operational control remains with the commander, USARJ/9th TAAC and since December 19, 2007, USARJ/I Corps (Forward).

On 11 March 2011, a devastating magnitude 9.0 earthquake and tsunami struck the northeast coast of Japan. Within minutes, USARJ began humanitarian assistance and disaster relief operations in support of the JGSDF during Operation Tomodachi, Japan's largest-ever bilateral operation. USARJ supported the affected people after operations officially ended by providing equipment and maintenance support to the JGSDF until September.

Notes

External links 
United States Army, Japan
Globalsecurity.org

1957 establishments in Japan
Army
Japan
Military units and formations established in 1957